Sergei Aleksandrovich Fokin (born 26 July 1961 in Ulyanovsk) is a former Russian footballer. He was famous during the days he played for CSKA Moscow for scoring numerous own goals, including 1990 league game against FC Spartak Moscow and European cup games against A.S. Roma and Rangers F.C.

International career
He earned three caps for USSR from 1989 to 1990, and was included in the squad for the 1990 FIFA World Cup. He also won a gold medal in the 1988 Olympics.

Honours
 Olympic champion: 1988
 Soviet Top League winner: 1991
 Soviet Cup winner: 1991

References

External links
Profile at RussiaTeam 

1961 births
Living people
Russian footballers
Soviet footballers
Soviet Union international footballers
1990 FIFA World Cup players
Olympic gold medalists for the Soviet Union
Olympic footballers of the Soviet Union
Footballers at the 1988 Summer Olympics
FC Alga Bishkek players
PFC CSKA Moscow players
Soviet Top League players
Russian Premier League players
Eintracht Braunschweig players
2. Bundesliga players
Russian expatriate footballers
Expatriate footballers in Germany
Olympic medalists in football
Sportspeople from Ulyanovsk
Medalists at the 1988 Summer Olympics
Association football defenders